Time and materials (T&M) is a standard phrase in a contract for construction, product development or any other piece of work in which the employer agrees to pay the contractor based upon the time spent  by the contractor's employees and subcontractors employees to perform the work, and for materials used in the construction (plus the contractor's mark up on the materials used), no matter how much work is required to complete construction. Time and materials is generally used in projects in which it is not possible to accurately estimate the size of the project, or when it is expected that the project requirements would most likely change.

This is opposed to a fixed-price contract in which the owner agrees to pay the contractor a lump sum for fulfillment of the contract no matter what the contractors pay their employees, sub-contractors and suppliers.

Many time and materials contracts also carry a guaranteed maximum price, which puts an upper limit on what the contractor may charge, but also allow the owner to pay a lesser amount if the job is completed more quickly.

References

Business terms
Contract law
Pricing
Procurement

fr:Assistance technique